Point #1 is the debut album by American rock band Chevelle, released May 4, 1999. It is the only Chevelle album released by Squint Entertainment and their only collaboration with producer Steve Albini. The album featured a notable single in its title track but achieved only minor success, especially compared to Chevelle's major label follow-up in 2002.

Background and recording
After recording a demo, Chevelle played small concerts for three years until being signed to Steve Taylor's independent Christian label Squint Entertainment. The band recorded for 17 days in Electrical Audio studios with producer Steve Albini, famous for his work with the likes of Nirvana, Cheap Trick, and PJ Harvey. According to Chevelle frontman Pete Loeffler, Albini gave their album an unrefined "indie feel" in which the recording process was essentially "plug in, he hits record, and you play." Loeffler added, "At the time I was shocked talking to someone who had worked closely to Kurt Cobain. It was a trip. It was really cool." Point #1 was recorded in standard D with an alternative metal approach. However, the band was left unsatisfied and feeling that he didn't achieve the tones and overall sound they were looking for. They called Albini and, much to his surprise, expressed disappointment with the final product. Although they enjoyed working with him, Chevelle wanted to find a different producer to resolve the issue; however, their label gave them no choice but to work with Albini once again. The second phase of recording was, according to Loeffler, much more laid back and relaxed in which Albini "really opened up."

Largely thanks to Albini's influence, Point #1 is notably less intense than future Chevelle material; however, the album's title track has remained a common part of the band's concert set list. Nevertheless, the band's major label debut, Wonder What's Next, has since been regarded by the band as their "first" album.

Touring and promotion
Chevelle toured with various alternative metal bands to promote their debut album. This would influence their shift to a heavier sound on future albums.

Albini and an aspiring comedian named Fred Armisen starred in the band's Point #1 EPK (electronic press kit)—several years before Armisen became famous on Saturday Night Live. Several months after the album's debut, a single was released in the title track which landed a marginal spot on Mainstream Rock Tracks and had an accompanying music video. The following year, "Mia" would be released as a follow-up. It also had a video.

Reception
Critical reception for Point #1 varied. Heather Phares of AllMusic gave a positive review, noting how Albini helped the band "create forceful, mercurial indie rock" and added "In line with Chicago's ambitious music scene, Chevelle's challenging take on rock is also a rewarding one."

Chevelle received GMA Dove Awards for the more popular song "Mia" in 2000 and "Point #1" in 2001. The album also received an award for "Hard Music Album" in 2000 by the Dove Awards.

Point #1 has earned Chevelle many comparisons to the successful progressive metal band Tool. The music video for "Mia" was, like some of Tool's videos, completely stop motion animated. Additionally, Pete Loeffler's vocals, like those of Maynard James Keenan, range from soft and melodic to brutal and gut-wrenching. "Long", for instance, is notable for Loeffler's climactic twelve-second-long scream.

Track listing

Personnel
Chevelle
 Pete Loeffler – guitar, vocals
 Joe Loeffler – bass
 Sam Loeffler – drums

Technical personnel
 Steve Albini – producer, engineer, mixing
 Buddy Jackson – art direction
 Hank Williams – mastering
 Mark Smalling – photography
 Sally Carns – back cover, design

Chart positions
Singles

References

1999 debut albums
Albums produced by Steve Albini
Chevelle (band) albums
Indie rock albums by American artists